Nick Stakal is a comics artist who is best known for providing the artwork for two of the Silent Hill comic books, Silent Hill: The Grinning Man, and Silent Hill: Dead/Alive.

References

External links
 

Living people
Year of birth missing (living people)
American comics artists